National Highway 309, commonly referred to as NH 309, is a highway connecting the city of Kashipur in Uttarakhand to Bubakhal in Uttarakhand.

References

External links 
NH 309 on OpenStreetMap

81
National highways in India